is a former Japanese football player.

Playing career
Kojima was born in Nagasaki Prefecture on 14 July 1968. After graduating from Tokyo University of Agriculture, he joined Fujitsu in 1991. He became a regular player as a defensive midfielder in his first season. In 1993, he moved to Sanfrecce Hiroshima. He also played as a defender, not only as a defensive midfielder. He played as a regular player and the club won second place in the 1994 J1 League, 1995, and 1996 Emperor's Cup. In 1999, he moved to Avispa Fukuoka. He played as a regular player as a center back. The club was relegated to the J2 League at the end of the 2001 season. Although he played often in 2002, he left the club for generational change and retired at the end of the 2002 season.

Club statistics

References

External links

biglobe.ne.jp

1968 births
Living people
Tokyo University of Agriculture alumni
Association football people from Nagasaki Prefecture
Japanese footballers
Japan Soccer League players
J1 League players
J2 League players
Japan Football League (1992–1998) players
Kawasaki Frontale players
Sanfrecce Hiroshima players
Avispa Fukuoka players
Association football defenders